Jan Zieliński (born 16 November 1996) is a Polish professional tennis player who specializes in doubles. He has an ATP career-high doubles ranking of world No. 15, which he attained on 30 January 2023 following the 2023 Australian Open final. He also has been ranked as high as world No. 769 in singles which he first achieved on 20 September 2021.

Professional career

2021: Maiden ATP doubles title & Top 100 debut
Zieliński made his top 100 doubles debut at No. 99 on 1 November 2021 after winning his first ATP Tour doubles title at the 2021 Moselle Open with his compatriot, Hubert Hurkacz.

2022: First Major quarterfinal, Second ATP title & top 35 debut
In January 2022, he made his debut participating as part of the Polish team at the 2022 ATP Cup, where he played doubles with Szymon Walków and won against Georgia and Argentina. After Hurkacz’s win over Diego Schwartzman sealed the victory for Poland over Argentina, the Polish team advanced to the semifinals. The pair won again against Spain in doubles but the team did not advance to the finals.

He reached the top 50 in doubles at World No. 49 on 18 July 2022.
In August on his debut at a Masters 1000 level, he reached his first semifinal at the 2022 National Bank Open also with Hurkacz defeating en route sixth seeds Puetz/Venus in the first round, Bopanna/Middelkoop in the second and fourth seeds, French Open champions Arévalo/Rogers in the quarterfinals.

At the US Open he reached the quarterfinals of a Grand Slam for the first time in his career partnering Hugo Nys defeating 10th seeded pair Jamie Murray/ Bruno Soares and Ariel Behar/Gonzalo Escobar. As a result he made his top 40 debut in the rankings. The pair won their first title together at the 2022 Moselle Open.

2023: First Grand Slam doubles final & top 15 debut
At the 2023 Australian Open, he achieved his career best Grand Slam result by advancing to the semifinal partnering again Hugo Nys. The pair defeated Rafael Matos/David Vega Hernández, Max Purcell/Jordan Thompson, second seeds Rajeev Ram/Joe Salisbury and Benjamin Bonzi/Arthur Rinderknech in the quarterfinal. The pair beat the French duo of Jérémy Chardy and Fabrice Martin in the semifinals to advance to their first Grand Slam final, where they lost to home favorites Australians Rinky Hijikata and Jason Kubler.

College career
Zieliński attended and played collegiate tennis at the University of Georgia.

ATP career finals

Doubles: 6 (2 titles, 4 runner-ups)

References

External links
 
 
 

1996 births
Living people
Polish male tennis players
Tennis players from Warsaw
Tennis players at the 2014 Summer Youth Olympics
Youth Olympic gold medalists for Poland
Georgia Bulldogs tennis players
21st-century Polish people